The 1983 Torneo Godó or Trofeo Conde de Godó was a men's tennis tournament that took place on outdoor clay courts at the Real Club de Tenis Barcelona in Barcelona, Catalonia in Spain. It was the 31st edition of the tournament and was part of the 1983 Grand Prix circuit. It was held from 3 October until 9 October 1983. First-seeded Mats Wilander won his second consecutive singles title at the event.

Finals

Singles

 Mats Wilander defeated  Guillermo Vilas 6–0, 6–3, 6–1
 It was Wilander's 7th singles title of the year and 11th of his career.

Doubles

 Anders Jarryd /  Hans Simonsson defeated  Jim Gurfein /  Erick Iskersky 7–5, 6–3

References

External links
 Official tournament website
 ITF tournament edition details
 ATP tournament profile

Barcelona Open (tennis)
Torneo Godó
Torneo Godó
Torneo Godó